WCOO (105.5 FM) is a radio station broadcasting an adult album alternative format. Licensed to Kiawah Island, South Carolina, United States, it serves the Charleston, South Carolina area. The station is currently owned by Lynn Martin. The station's studios are located in Charleston due west of downtown (west of the Ashley River) and the transmitter site is in Mount Pleasant.

History
Originally, this station was WWMC, licensed to Moncks Corner, South Carolina and broadcasting at 3,000 watts.

In the late 1990s, WNST "New Star" played hot adult contemporary music.

In December 1998, WCOO switched from adult contemporary to rhythmic oldies, becoming "Cool 105.3". Soon, WCOO made big ratings gains at the expense of WXLY. WXLY recovered but WCOO continued to improve.

In January 2004, WCOO changed to its current format.

References

External links

COO
Adult album alternative radio stations in the United States
Radio stations established in 1969
1969 establishments in South Carolina